Beverley Anne Mason (called Bev) is a British Anglican bishop. Since 2018, she has served as the Bishop of Warrington, a suffragan bishop in the Diocese of Liverpool. She was the Archdeacon of Richmond and Craven in the Diocese of Leeds from 2016 to 2018.

Early life and education
Mason was born in Germany. She trained for ordained ministry at Trinity College, Bristol, an evangelical Anglican theological college. During this time she also studied theology, and graduated with a Bachelor of Arts (BA) degree in 2000. After a further year of training, she left theological college to be ordained.

Ordained ministry
Mason was ordained in the Church of England as a deacon in 2001 and as a priest in 2003. She served curacies at St Paul's Church, Rusthall (2001 to 2002) and St Margaret's Church, Rainham (2002 to 2005) in the Diocese of Rochester. She was then Vicar of the Church of St John the Evangelist, Upper Norwood in the Diocese of Southwark from 2005 to 2012. She was additionally Area Dean of Croydon North between 2010 and 2012.

In 2012, Mason moved to Yorkshire, having been appointed Priest-in-Charge of Church of All Saints, Bingley in the Diocese of Bradford. She was made Vicar of All Saints a year later. She was announced as the next Archdeacon of Richmond and Craven of the Diocese of Leeds in September 2015, and left All Saints at the end of 2015. She took up the appointment of archdeacon in 2016.

Episcopal ministry
On 24 July 2018, it was announced Mason would become the next Bishop of Warrington, a suffragan bishop in the Diocese of Liverpool. She was consecrated as a bishop at York Minster by John Sentamu, Archbishop of York, on 18 October 2018. She was officially welcomed into the diocese during a service at Liverpool Cathedral on 17 November 2018. In the vacancy following Paul Bayes' retirement, Mason is also acting diocesan Bishop of Liverpool.

References

Alumni of Trinity College, Bristol
Archdeacons of Richmond
Living people
21st-century Church of England bishops
1960 births
Bishops of Warrington
Women Anglican bishops